Ronald A. Rivett (1918 – August 7, 1977) was a Canadian politician who served on the Yukon Territorial Council from 1970 to 1974. He was elected in the 1970 Yukon general election for the district of Mayo, and served as speaker of the council during his term. He was a bookkeeper. On March 6, 1972, Rivett accepted the Yukon Territorial Mace as a gift from Governor General Roland Michener. Rivett died at a hospital in Whitehorse in 1977 at the age of 59.

References

1918 births
1977 deaths
Members of the Yukon Territorial Council
Speakers of the Yukon Legislative Assembly
Spanish emigrants to Canada